The Privy Council ministry was a short-lived reorganization of English government that was reformed to place the ministry under the control of the Privy Council in April 1679, due to events in that time.

Formation
It followed years of widespread discontent with the government, which had been consistently autocratic and clandestine since the Restoration and was now mired in conflict between Parliament and King Charles. Sir William Temple, England's foremost diplomat and greatly respected both at home and abroad, was recalled at the beginning of 1679 and became the king's closest advisor. Elections to the House of Commons returned a majority for the opponents of the government, the Earl of Danby was forced from office and Temple led the formation of a new ministry, aiming to reconcile the conflicting factions of the day.

Temple believed the king should not exercise absolute power but was also uncomfortable with the increasing prominence of Parliament. He sought to create a less divisive body that could carry popular support without trying to dictate to the king. He proposed that the king should no longer be advised by any one individual or by a select committee of the Privy Council, but by a reformed council as a whole. The new council would have thirty members, rather than fifty: Fifteen would hold paid high office in government, the Church or the judiciary; fifteen would be independent, representing the parliamentary factions and chosen for their wealth (which Temple felt was the source of power). The king would give full consideration to the opinions of the council, which would be free to discuss and vote on all matters. The king duly dismissed the existing council; news of this, and that the new government would include members of the country party and the king's popular, illegitimate son, Monmouth, was widely welcomed. However, Charles took against the scheme when Temple insisted on the inclusion of Viscount Halifax, whom he disliked personally. He agreed but insisted, to Temple's alarm, that the Earl of Shaftesbury, the government's most vociferous critic, should also be included. This sabotaged Temple's council, ensuring irreconcilable division.

First meeting of the council, and its collapse

The new council met on 21 April. Within hours, it had been subverted as a group of nine conflicting members took a lead in the conduct of business; Temple reacted angrily, almost leaving the council, then consenting to form a group of four (with Halifax, Essex and Sunderland) to advise the king in secret. The four worked well together, but the full council was sharply divided. Shaftesbury now effectively led the opposition from within the government itself, with the support of a majority in the Commons. In the face of the Exclusion Bill, the king prorogued and then dissolved Parliament without the council's approval. Temple withdrew from active participation, leaving Halifax, Essex and Sunderland to exercise power as a Triumvirate, and a thirty-first councillor was appointed. When the king fell ill and his brother's return from the Dutch Republic caused alarm in the country, Temple expressed his concerns to the Triumvirate but was no longer taken seriously. Elections for the new Parliament returned another opposition majority, and the king prorogued it before it met, again in spite of the council. Shaftesbury was discharged from office and other leading critics of the government resigned. Temple's experiment ended with the rise of Laurence Hyde, a strong supporter of the King, in November.

The ministry

Ministers not in the Privy Council

References

English ministries
1679 establishments in England
1679 disestablishments in England
Ministries of Charles II of England
1670s in England